Richard Freeman may refer to:

Richard Freeman (bridge) (1933–2009), bridge player
Richard Freeman (cryptozoologist) (born 1970), cryptozoologist and author
Richard Freeman (Irish judge) (1646–1710), Lord Chancellor of Ireland
R. Austin Freeman (1862–1943), British writer of detective stories
Richard B. Freeman (born 1943), American economist
Richard Cameron Freeman (1926–1999), U.S. federal judge
Richard P. Freeman (1869–1944), U.S. Representative from Connecticut
R. B. Freeman (1915–1986), Darwin bibliographer
Richard Knill Freeman (1840–1904), British architect
Richard Freeman (doctor) (born 1959/1960), sports physician and doctor
Richard R. Freeman (born 1944), physicist, researcher and author

See also
Richard Friedman (disambiguation) (pronounced Freedman)